The China-Japan Friendship Hospital also abbreviated as China-Japan Hospital was established through the cooperation of the Chinese and Japanese governments during the 1980s. The hospital has been directly affiliated with China's Ministry of Health since its first day of operation, October 23, 1984. The hospital is located on East Yinghuayuan Street, Chaoyang District, Beijing. Within the hospital, there are 1,500 beds, 58 departments, as well as a clinical research and education center. The hospital has intensive care and treatment of severe diseases as a primary focus and integrative eastern-western medicinal therapy as an additional area of expertise. The hospital often attends to the health care of senior officials from over 100 countries and regions.

The hospital is the teaching hospital of Beijing University Medical School, Beijing University of Traditional Chinese Medicine, China Medical University and Tianjin Medical University, etc. The hospital carries out medical care, education, scientific research, preventative medicine and rehabilitation.

Overview
The China-Japan Friendship Hospital was designated a tertiary A-level hospital in 1993. It was also ranked among the “Top 10 Hospitals in Beijing” and as one of the “Top 100 Hospitals in China.” In 2001, it was listed as one of the Central Government's health care hospitals. It serves as the teaching hospital for student interns from Peking University and Beijing University of Chinese Medicine. In 2004, it was one of the first hospitals to offer year-round outpatient therapy without closing for holidays.

In 2005, the hospital was named "National Integrative Medicine Center for Cardiovascular Disease" and "National Pain Clinical Research Center". On behalf of China's Ministry of Health, the hospital is in charge of research programs in the fields of nephrology, neurology, cardiology, orthopedics, and Traditional Chinese Medicine (TCM) oncology, the latter is a subject of the National Administration of Traditional Chinese Medicine. Two programs offered by the hospital, electro-chemotherapy and "An's Therapy" in Proctology, are listed by China's Ministry of Health among the top 100 programs of the decade. Several departments, including Orthopedics, TCM Rheumatology, and Electro-Chemotherapy, have taken charge of major programs under the Fund of Capital Medical Development.

In 2006, the hospital was designated an A-class appointed medical institution, with the ability to serve any insurance policy holder within Beijing. Among the staff, more than 450 staff members have advanced titles and technical posts; nearly 400 have master's degrees or higher levels of education. The hospital owns medical equipment such as MRI, Spiral CT, DSA, MLA, Color Doppler, operation pilot system and automatic biochemistry analyzer, etc.

As a large medical institution in China, the China-Japan Friendship Hospital was rated "the best hospital for foreigners in Beijing" by the Association for Foreigners. Cooperative programs have been set up in conjunction with universities, academies and medical institutions in  Japan, the United States, France, and Korea.

The national government of China recognized the China-Japan Friendship Hospital as an example of national spirit when, in 2003, it was designated a key hospital in the battle against SARS. The hospital was the designated medical center for the 2008 Summer Olympics. In addition to the safeguarding of spectators and participants in the National Stadium (the "Bird’s Nest"), it was the primary medical facility serving the athletes, coaches, referees, and officials.

Since 1984, co-operative projects have been set up between the hospital and overseas universities, including Tokyo University, Keio University, Osaka University, Washington University in St. Louis, Harvard University, Cambridge University and Helsinki Polytechnics.

Scope of service
Clinical services:
 Acupuncture
 Cardiology
 Cardiovascular Surgery
 Colorectal Surgery
 Clinical Laboratory
 Dermatology
 Dental care and Orthodontics
 Digestive Disorders
 Diabetes
 Endocrinology
 Emergency Medicine
 ENT (Ear, Nose and Throat)
 Gastroenterology
 General Surgery
 Gynecology
 Immunology
 Infectious Medicine
 Internal Medicine
 Lung and Spleen
 Massage
 Neurology
 Nephrology
 Neurosurgery
 Orthopedics
 Obstetrics and Gynecology
 Ophthalmology (Eye Surgery)
 Oncology
 Pediatrics
 Pain Clinic
 Pharmacy
 Psychological counseling
 Respiratory Medicine
 Rheumatology
 Rehabilitation
 Thoracic Surgery
 Urology
 Ultrasound Services

Location and access
The China-Japan Friendship Hospital is located on East Yinghua (Cherry Blossom) Road, Chaoyang District 100029. Nearest subway stations are Guangximen and Shaoyaoju on Line 13 and Line 10 and Huixinxijie Beikou on Line 5.

See also
 List of hospitals in Beijing

References

External links 
  
 the China-Japan Friendship Hospital official website 
 

Hospital buildings completed in 1984
Hospitals in Beijing
Buildings and structures in Chaoyang District, Beijing
China–Japan relations